Keith Hunter may refer to:

 Keith Hunter (chemist) (1951–2018), New Zealand ocean chemist
 Keith Hunter (politician), English police officer and politician

See also
 Keith Hunter Jesperson (born 1955), Canadian-American serial killer